Nikola Ninković (born 19 December 1994) is a Serbian professional footballer who plays as an attacking midfielder for Borac Banja Luka.

Club career

Partizan
On 11 July 2011, alongside Lazar Marković, Ninković signed his first professional contract with Partizan, on a five-year deal. He made his competitive debut for the club in the return leg of the UEFA Champions League second qualifying round, coming on as a substitute for Zvonimir Vukić in a 1–0 away win over Shkëndija on 19 July 2011. After missing the vast majority of the 2011–12 season due to mononucleosis, Ninković made his league debut in a 4–1 away victory against Rad on 31 March 2012. He recorded three more appearances until the end of the 2011–12 season, as the club won the league title.

On 11 August 2012, Ninković scored his first competitive goal for Partizan in a 7–0 home league victory over BSK Borča. He became the club's youngest captain ever on 31 October 2012 at 17 years, 10 months and 12 days, coming on as a substitute in a 1–2 Serbian Cup loss to Borac Čačak, thus surpassing Stevan Jovetić. The record was later broken by Andrija Živković.

On 30 October 2013, Ninković scored a brace in a 3–0 Serbian Cup win away at Radnički Niš. He also scored an 86th-minute winning goal in a 2–1 home league victory over the same opponent on 1 March 2014, before being sent off in the 88th minute of the game.

On 22 July 2014, Ninković scored his first goal for Partizan in UEFA competitions, scoring an equalizer in a 3–1 away win against HB Tórshavn. He made a total of 38 appearances and scored six goals in all competitions during the 2014–15 campaign.

Genoa
On 1 February 2016, Ninković was transferred to Italian club Genoa, being immediately loaned to fellow Serie A side Chievo until the end of the 2015–16 season. He subsequently returned to Genoa for the 2016–17 season, making 19 appearances and scoring three goals in the process. Under coach Ivan Jurić, he was deployed as a play-making left back in a 3-4-2-1 formation.

Ascoli
On 18 August 2018, Ninković signed a three-season contract with Serie B team Ascoli.

Brescia 
On 1 February 2021, Ninković signed with Serie B club Brescia.

International career
Ninković represented Serbia at the 2011 UEFA Under-17 Championship that was hosted by his country. He was also a member of the team at the 2012 UEFA Under-19 Championship that took place in Estonia. In the second game of the group stage, Ninković scored directly from a corner kick in a 1–2 loss to England on 6 July 2012.

On 7 September 2012, Ninković scored the equalizing goal on his under-21 debut in a 1–1 away draw with Denmark. He also appeared in a 0–1 home loss to England in the UEFA Under-21 Championship 2013 qualification play-offs. On 25 October 2012, alongside Ognjen Mudrinski, Ninković received a one-year ban from the Football Association of Serbia following incidents after the game with England.

In late 2016, ahead of the UEFA Under-21 Championship 2017 qualification play-offs, Ninković was called up to the under-21 team for the first time after the Kruševac incident.

Statistics

Honours
Partizan
 Serbian SuperLiga: 2011–12, 2012–13, 2014–15
 Serbian Cup: Runner-up 2014–15

Empoli
 Serie B: 2017–18

Notes

References

External links
 
 
 

Serbian footballers
A.C. ChievoVerona players
Association football midfielders
Expatriate footballers in Italy
FK Partizan players
Genoa C.F.C. players
Empoli F.C. players
Ascoli Calcio 1898 F.C. players
Brescia Calcio players
FK Proleter Novi Sad players
People from Bogatić
Serbia under-21 international footballers
Serbia youth international footballers
Serbian expatriate footballers
Serbian expatriate sportspeople in Italy
Serbian SuperLiga players
Serie A players
Serie B players
1994 births
Living people